Gladys Musyoki (born 30 November 1994) is a Kenyan long jumper turned sprinter. She represented her country at two consecutive Commonwealth Games, starting in 2014.

International competitions

Personal bests
Outdoor
200 metres – 24.79 (Nairobi 2018)
400 metres – 53.41 (Gold Coast 2018)
Long jump – 6.17 (Nairobi 2014)
Triple jump – 12.98 (Nairobi 2014)

References

1987 births
Living people
Kenyan female sprinters
Kenyan female long jumpers
Kenyan female triple jumpers
Athletes (track and field) at the 2014 Commonwealth Games
Athletes (track and field) at the 2018 Commonwealth Games
People from Machakos County
Commonwealth Games competitors for Kenya